Silver Fox is a fictional character in Marvel Comics. She currently works for the terrorist organization HYDRA and is also known as a former love interest for Wolverine.

The character has appeared in several X-Men animated series and video games, and was portrayed by Lynn Collins in the 2009 film X-Men Origins: Wolverine.

Publication history
Silver Fox first appears in Wolverine vol. 2 #10 and was created by Chris Claremont and John Buscema.

Fictional character biography
Silver Fox is a member of the First Nation Blackfoot Confederacy. In the early to late 1900s, she lived with Wolverine as his lover in Canada. She was allegedly murdered by Sabretooth on Wolverine's birthday, but is later revealed to be alive and a member of "Team X", the most formidable covert ops team the CIA had to offer. Fox eventually betrays Team X and becomes a member of HYDRA, a subversive terrorist organization.

Silver Fox reappears during the modern period when Wolverine tracks down each member of the Weapon X staff, discovering the studios where many of his memories, which he believes to be real, were staged. Allegedly she kills the professor who had been in charge of the program after Logan left. At this point it is revealed that Silver Fox is in command of a section of HYDRA.

Shortly thereafter, Silver Fox captures the assassin Reiko, and forms an alliance with Reiko's boss, Hand Jonin Matsu'o Tsurayaba. Matsu'o is in the process of trying to buy Clan Yashida's underworld connections before Mariko Yashida severs them entirely. Silver Fox dupes Reiko into poisoning Mariko, giving Matsu'o what he wanted. Silver Fox's motivations in this are unclear.

Later, when Mastodon, a member of the Weapon X Program, dies due to the failure of his anti-aging factor, Silver Fox reunites with Logan, Creed, Maverick, and Wraith. She is cold to Logan, and seems not to remember having spent any pleasant time with him. The group infiltrates a secret base and confronts the man who had implanted them with their false memories: Aldo Ferro, the Psi-Borg. After Carol Hines dies of fright at the hands of Ferro's transformation, Ferro takes control of their minds and this time makes Creed kill Silver Fox. After Ferro's defeat, Silver Fox was to be buried in Salem Center. At the church, Logan discovered that her body has been prepared for flight. The father at the church notifies Logan that "a brick wall with an eyepatch" gave the order. Suddenly, a S.H.I.E.L.D. carrier arrives with Nick Fury, who states he never imagined the day when a top-ranking HYDRA member would get a full honors S.H.I.E.L.D. burial. Wraith appears as well, having orchestrated the entire funeral, stating "Salem Center meant nothing to her". Wraith tells Logan that they found the cabin where he really had lived with Silver Fox a lifetime ago. He gets permission to bury her there, by himself with only a shovel and uses the part of the door with "Silver Fox + Logan" in a heart that he had carved into it as a headstone.

Before beheading Sabretooth, Wolverine expresses his doubt on whether or not the events of Silver Fox's return actually happened at all, but admits the pain and loss he'd felt again during that time was very much real.

Powers and abilities
Silver Fox possesses an accelerated healing and an age suppressant, allowing her to retain her looks after years of being separated from Logan.

In other media

 Silver Fox appears in the X-Men: The Animated Series episode "Weapon X, Lies and Videotape" as a member of Team X.
 Kayla Silverfox appears in X-Men Origins: Wolverine, portrayed by Lynn Collins. This version is of Native American descent, possesses tactile manipulation, allowing her to persuade anyone she touches into doing whatever she says, with individuals that possesses healing factors such as Wolverine and Victor Creed being immune, was previously in a relationship with the former, and works as a school teacher. Additionally, she gave Logan his codename "Wolverine" after a Native American legend. She reluctantly works with William Stryker and Creed to fake her death and manipulate Logan to save her sister Emma. While working with Logan to save Stryker's mutant captives, Kayla is mortally wounded while Stryker shoots Logan with an adamantium bullet, erasing most of his memories. Before she dies, she forces Stryker to walk perpetually.
 Kayla Silverfox appears in the X-Men Origins: Wolverine tie-in game, voiced by April Stewart.
 Silver Fox appears in the Wolverine versus Sabretooth motion comic, voiced by Heather Doerksen.

References

External links
 
 

Characters created by Chris Claremont
Comics characters introduced in 1989
Fictional Blackfoot people
Fictional characters with memory disorders
Fictional First Nations people
Fictional secret agents and spies
Hydra (comics) agents
Marvel Comics characters with accelerated healing
Marvel Comics female supervillains
Marvel Comics film characters
Marvel Comics mutants
X-Men supporting characters
Fictional Native American women